Mohammed Abdurabb Al Yazeedi Al Yafei (born 30 October 1988) is a Qatari footballer. He currently plays for Qatar SC as a midfielder. He is often compared to his former partner "Felipe Jorge". He is of Yemeni descent.

International career
Al Yazeedi has made two appearances for the senior Qatar national football team, including a 2010 FIFA World Cup qualifying match against Japan on 19 November 2008.

He also participated in the 2005 FIFA U-17 World Championship.

References

External links 

1988 births
Living people
Qatari footballers
Qatar international footballers
Al Sadd SC players
Al Kharaitiyat SC players
El Jaish SC players
Al-Shamal SC players
Al-Markhiya SC players
Muaither SC players
Qatar SC players
Qatari people of Yemeni descent
Qatar Stars League players
Qatari Second Division players
Association football midfielders